Bakhtiyor Ashurmatov , (born 25 March 1976) is a former player and current manager. He played for the Uzbekistan national team as a defender.

Career

International
Ashurmatov was born in Kokand, Uzbek SSR, Soviet Union. He has made 54 appearances and scored one goal for the full Uzbekistan national football team since his debut in 1997. He has appeared in 22 qualifying matches for the last four World Cups.

Managerial
Ashurmatov retired from football in 2012, playing the first half of the 2012 season for Lokomotiv Tashkent. After that he started his managing career at FK Guliston. He gained promotion to Uzbek League, finishing 2012 Uzbekistan First League as runners-up.

After 2013 season end he left FK Guliston and in December 2013 joined Bunyodkor coaching staff. On 10 January 2014 he was appointed as head coach of Navbahor Namangan.

On 18 February 2015 Ashurmatov was appointed as new head coach of Uzbekistan U-23 team. He kept his head coach position at Navbahor. With Uzbekistan U-22 he qualified to 2016 AFC U-23 Championship after team finished runners-up in group in qualification tournament played end of March 2015.
On 23 June 2015 Ashurmatov was fired from his post at U-22 team.

Career statistics

Club

International

Statistics accurate as of match played 6 September 2008

International goals
Scores and results list. Uzbekistan's goal tally first.

Honours

Club

MHSK Tashkent
 Uzbek League (1): 1997
 Uzbek Cup (1): 1995

Pakhtakor
 Uzbek League (4): 1998, 2002, 2004, 2005
 Uzbek Cup (4): 2001, 2002, 2004, 2005

Dustlik
 Uzbek League (1): 2000
 Uzbek Cup (1): 2000

Bunyodkor
 Uzbek League (3): 2007, 2008, 2009
 Uzbek Cup (1): 2008
 AFC Champions League semifinal: 2008

Manager
FK Guliston
 Uzbekistan First League runners-up (1): 2012

References

External links
Bio at playerhistory.com
Bakhtiyor Ashurmatov at Footballdatabase

1976 births
Uzbeks
Living people
Uzbekistani footballers
Uzbekistani expatriate footballers
Uzbekistan international footballers
2000 AFC Asian Cup players
2004 AFC Asian Cup players
Pakhtakor Tashkent FK players
FC Moscow players
FC Spartak Vladikavkaz players
PFC Krylia Sovetov Samara players
FC Bunyodkor players
PFC Lokomotiv Tashkent players
FC Dustlik players
Russian Premier League players
Expatriate footballers in Russia
Uzbekistani expatriate sportspeople in Russia
Association football defenders
Navbahor Namangan managers
PFK Nurafshon managers